Mount Malindang is a complex volcano located in the province of Misamis Occidental in the southern island of Mindanao, Philippines. It is the highest point in the province. The least studied mountain range was formed through several volcanic activities some of which could be historical, evident by the presence of two calderas, surrounded by high rock walls, cinder cones, dome volcano plugs, two sulfurous hot springs, and a crater lake named Lake Duminagat. The amphitheater structures have extensive distribution of volcanic rocks, carbonized wood that are found in pyroclastic deposits. The mountain range is dissected by several canyons and ravines.

Classification
Malindang has unofficialy historical eruptions but it believed to be in 1822 and is classified as inactive by the Philippine Institute of Volcanology and Seismology.

Mount Malindang Natural Park
Mount Malindang and the whole Malindang Mountain Range alluring qualities come from its waterfalls, crater lake and dense virgin forests which host diverse and rare species of flora and fauna. On June 19, 1971, the area was proclaimed as Mount Malindang National Park by virtue of Republic Act 6266. Under the establishment of National Integrated Protected Areas System (NIPAS) in 1992, the park was reclassified and was renamed as Mount Malindang Range Natural Park on August 2, 2002 through Proclamation No. 228.

About  are cultivated and inhabited by indigenous people mostly the Subanon tribe.

Fauna
The national park is known to harbor a rich and unique biodiversity that is yet to be explored. The mountain and its outlying areas, some are unexplored, are home to some of the endemic and endangered species in the Philippines, which include:.

 Greater Mindanao shrew (Crocidura grandis)
 Tarsier (Carlito syrichta)
 Flying lemur (Cynocephalus volans)
 Long-tailed macaque (Macaca fascicularis)
 Philippine deer (Cervus mariannus)
 Asian palm civet (Paradoxurus hermaphroditus subsp. philippinensis)
 Philippine warty pig (Sus philippensis)
 Rough-armed tree frog (Kurixalus appendiculatus)
 Marbled water monitor (Varanus marmoratus)
 Philippine hawk-eagle (Nisaetus philippensis)
 Philippine eagle (Pithecophaga jefferyi)
 Rufous hornbill (Buceros hydrocorax)
 Philippine hanging parakeet/colasisi (Loriculus philippensis)
 Philippine pygmy woodpecker (Dendrocopos maculatus)

Economic importance 
Mount Malindang and its adjoining mountain range including Dapitan Peak and Mt Bliss, is a catchment area which drains water through 49 rivers and streams, and numerous creeks. It provides potable water for domestic, agricultural and other uses to more than one million inhabitants of Misamis Occidental and the eastern parts of Zamboanga del Norte and Zamboanga del Sur.

ASEAN Heritage Park
Declared as Association of Southeast Asian Nations (ASEAN) Heritage Park (AHP), during the 13th Informal ASEAN Ministerial Meeting on the Environment held October 13, 2011 in Cambodia. The three other Philippine AHPs are Mount Iglit-Baco National Park in Mindoro, Mount Kitanglad Range in Bukidnon, and Mount Apo Natural Park in Davao.

It was officially launched on August 4, 2012, during the 2nd National ASEAN Heritage Park (AHP) Conference, sponsored by the ASEAN Center for Bio-diversity (ACB) at Oroquieta City.

See also
 List of active volcanoes in the Philippines
 List of potentially active volcanoes in the Philippines
 List of inactive volcanoes in the Philippines
 List of protected areas of the Philippines
 List of Ultras of the Philippines

References

External links
 

Mountain ranges of the Philippines
Malindang
Malindang
ASEAN heritage parks
Landforms of Misamis Occidental
Inactive volcanoes of the Philippines
Natural parks of the Philippines
Landforms of Zamboanga del Norte
Landforms of Zamboanga del Sur
World Heritage Tentative List for the Philippines
Misamis Occidental